The Town of Franklin is a city in Norfolk County, Massachusetts, United States. Franklin is one of thirteen Massachusetts municipalities that have applied for, and been granted, city forms of government but wish to retain "The town of" in their official names. As of 2022, the city's population was 36,745, with a growth rate of 15.38% since 2015. It is home to the country's first public library, the Franklin Public Library with its first books donated by Benjamin Franklin in 1790. It also contains the largest Catholic parish in the Boston Archdiocese, St. Mary's Catholic church, with some 15,000 members.

History

Franklin was first settled by Europeans in 1660 and officially incorporated during the American Revolution. The town was formed from the western part of the town of Wrentham, and it was officially incorporated on March 2, 1778; its designated name at incorporation was to be Exeter. However, the town's citizens opted to call it Franklin, in honor of the statesman Benjamin Franklin, the first municipality in the U.S. to be so named.

It was hoped that Benjamin Franklin would donate a bell for a church steeple in the town, but he donated 116 books instead, including Night-Thoughts, James Janeway's Invisible Realities, and the works of John Locke. On November 20, 1790, it was decided that the volumes would be lent to the residents of Franklin for free via its library, which has been in operation since then as the Franklin Public Library. The Ray Memorial Library building was dedicated in 1904. In 1990, on the library's bicentennial, its staff published a booklet, "A History of America's First Public Library at Franklin Massachusetts, 1790 ~ 1990" to commemorate America's first public library and book collection.

The town is also home to the birthplace of America's father of public education, Horace Mann. The town is also home to what may have been the nation's oldest continuously operational one-room school house (Croydon, New Hampshire's school dates to 1780, but there is debate as to whether it is truly "one room"). The Red Brick School was started in 1792, its building constructed in 1833, and was operational until 2008. St. Mary's Catholic Church, located in central Franklin and built by Matthew Sullivan, is the largest Catholic parish in the Boston Archdiocese with some 15,000 members.

Geography

Franklin is located at  (42.0891, –71.4069).

Much of the Town of Franklin lies within the Charles River watershed. Principal streams include Mine, Shepard's, Miller, Uncas, Dix and Miscoe Brooks. Much of the marshland along Mine Brook has been permanently protected by the Natural Valley Storage Project of the U.S. Army Corps of Engineers. The extreme southwest corner of Franklin is part of the Blackstone River watershed. The town has an impounded series of lakes known as the Franklin Reservoir, which is not used as a public drinking water supply. The lakes are now protected open space. 

Ernest DelCarte (1911-2000) bequeathed the land that would become the conservation area to the Town of Franklin. The DelCarte family assisted in the transfer to Franklin in return for the town's commitment to preserve the land as open space. Worth an estimated $3 million at the time of the transfer of title, the Recreation and Conservation Area received a multi-million-dollar upgrade in 2014. Significant public forests and parks include the Franklin State and the Franklin Town Forests.

Demographics

As of the 2010 census, there were 31,852 people, 10,866 households, and 7,877 families residing in the town.
The racial makeup of the city was 92.8 percent White, 3.83 percent Asian or Pacific Islander, 2.0 percent Hispanic or Latino of any race, 1.4 percent Black or African American, 0.15 percent Native American, 0.29 percent from other races, and 1.4% from two or more races.

There were 10,866 households, out of which 44.6% had children under the age of 18 living with them, 66.4% contained married couples living together, 22.4% were non-families, and 8.5% had a female householder with no husband present. 18.3% of all households were made up of individuals, and 6.7% had someone living alone 65 years of age or older. The average household size was 2.80, the average family size 3.29.

The population includes 28.5% under the age of 18, 6.5% from 18 to 24, 35.1% from 25 to 44, 19.9% from 45 to 64, and 9.4% who were 65 years of age or older. The median age was 35 years. For every 100 females, there were 96.1 males. For every 100 females age 18 and over, there were 93.4 males.

The median household income in the town was $92,066, and the median income for a family was $81,826 (these figures had risen to $89,659 and $101,900, respectively, as of a 2008 estimate)). Men had a median income of $58,888 versus $36,557 for women; the per capita income for the town was $27,849. About 2.2% of families and 3.6% of the population were below the poverty line, including 2.8% of those under 18 and 5.2% of those 65 or over.

65.5% of Franklin residents claim to be religious, of that 54.2% are Catholic, 3.0% are Jewish, 2.2% are Presbyterian, 1.7% are Episcopalian, while members of Baptist, Lutheran, Methodist, Buddhist, Pentecostal, Mormon, Hindu, Mennonite, and Muslim faiths make up less than 1.0% of the population each.

Government
The town is represented in the Massachusetts General Court by Representative Jeffrey Roy and Senators Rebecca Rausch and Karen Spilka.

It is part of the Massachusetts Senate's Norfolk, Bristol and Middlesex district. The Town is located in Massachusetts's 4th congressional district and is currently represented by Jake Auchincloss.

Education

The Franklin Public Schools have five elementary schools serving K–5, three middle schools serving 6-8, and one high school serving 9–12. There is one charter school (grades K–8).

Elementary Schools K–5:
John F. Kennedy Memorial School
Gerald M. Parmenter Elementary School
Oak Street Elementary School
Helen Keller Elementary School
Jefferson Elementary School
The Red Brick School is a historic school in the town. It was used at various times for kindergarten through 4th grade students; sometimes for multiple grades simultaneously.  It was one of the longest running one-room schools in the USA.

Middle Schools 6-8:
Horace Mann Middle School
Annie Sullivan Middle School 
Remington Middle School

High School 9–12:
Franklin High School constructed a new high school building and tore down the old one in 2014.
 Tri-County Regional Vocational Technical High School 

The Town of Franklin is also home to Dean College, founded in 1865, a private residential college with over 1,100 students. The college grants associate degrees in a number of subjects (98% of the students are accepted for transfer to four-year schools) and also offers bachelor's programs in Arts and Entertainment Management, Psychology, Sociology, History, English, Business, Marketing, Criminal Justice and Homeland Security Management, Sport Management, Sport Fitness, Recreation and Coaching, Dance, Liberal Arts & Studies, and Theater.

Points of interest
As noted, the Franklin Public Library is the first public library in America, the original books of which were donated by Benjamin Franklin. Across the street from the library is Dean College.

At one end of Franklin's Historic District is the little Red Brick School. Its classroom, believed to be one of the oldest public schools in the United States, but is not still functioning, celebrated its 175th birthday in 2008.

Transportation

Franklin has easy access to major cities like Boston and Providence with its two exits along I-495 at Route 140 and King Street. Commuter rail service from Boston's South Station is provided by the MBTA with the Forge Park/495 and Franklin/Dean College stops on its Franklin Line.

Franklin is part of the Greater Attleboro Taunton Regional Transit Authority (GATRA) service region, which operates the Franklin Area Bus. Its route includes stops to the Municipal Building, Senior Center, Franklin Public Library, and the Franklin Village Shopping center.

Notable people

 Charles Partridge Adams, born in Franklin, 1858; landscape painter, Gold Medal of National Mining and Industrial Exposition, Denver, for landscape
 Asa Aldis, Chief Justice of the Vermont Supreme Court
 Maria Barrett, US Army Major General; elder sister of US Army General Paula Lodi 
 Edward Reed Blake, born in Franklin; Wisconsin state legislator and businessman
 Bernard Davis (1916–1994), biologist, was born in Franklin
 Oliver Dean, MD, born in Franklin, 1783; physician and educator, benefactor and founder of Dean Academy
 George Warren Fuller, born in Franklin, 1868; responsible for important innovations in water and wastewater treatment
 Richard Grieco, Class of 1983, actor and former fashion model
 Eddie Grant (baseball), born in 1883; baseball player, killed in WWI
 Murray Hill, comedian, drag king
 Kristi Kirshe, American rugby sevens player
 Peter Laviolette, born in 1964 and grew up in Franklin; professional ice hockey player and coach – NHL hockey coach
 Paula Lodi, US Army Brigadier General; younger sister of US Army General Maria Barrett 
 Horace Mann, born in Franklin, 1796; educator
 Theron Metcalf, born in Franklin, 1784; Associate Justice of the Massachusetts Supreme Judicial Court
 Robbie O'Connell, folk singer, former resident of Franklin
 Jen O'Malley Dillon, political strategist and campaign manager
 Albert D. Richardson, born in Franklin, 1833; journalist, spy, and author
 Bobby Santos III, born in Franklin, 1985; NASCAR driver
 Ilario Zannino, mobster, former resident of Franklin
 Jermaine Samuels, basketball player, grew up in Franklin

References

Source
 McCarthy Earls, Eamon. "Franklin: From Puritan Precinct to 21st Century Edge City." Franklin: Via Appia Press (www.viaappiapress.com), 2012;

External links

 
 

1660 establishments in Massachusetts
Cities in Massachusetts
Cities in Norfolk County, Massachusetts
Populated places established in 1660